Karanji may refer to:

 Karanji (film), a 2009 Kannada-language Indian film
 Karanji Lake, a lake in the Mysore city of Karnataka, India
 Karanji, Maharashtra, a village, List of villages in Pathardi taluka, in Pathardi taluka, Ahmednagar district, Maharashtra State, India
 Fried sweet dumplings made of wheat flour and stuffed with dry or moist coconut delicacies. Also called gujiya